The Salvatore Martirano Memorial Composition Award is an international composers' competition held annually in memory of Salvatore Martirano (1927–1995), who was an internationally acclaimed American composer and served as professor of composition at the University of Illinois from 1963 to 1995. The first place prize consists of US$1,000 and a performance by the Illinois Modern Ensemble at the Krannert Center for the Performing Arts.


Awards

References

External links
Salvatore Martirano Memorial Composition Award page at University of Illinois at Urbana–Champaign
Salvatore Martirano Memorial Composition Award page at Spineless Books
Salvatore Martirano Memorial Composition Awardees at University of Illinois at Urbana–Champaign

Awards established in 1996
American music awards
University of Illinois Urbana-Champaign